Gustavo Matías Alustiza (born 31 May 1984) is an Argentine professional footballer who plays for Santamarina as a forward.

Nicknamed El Chavo (Mexican slang for boy), Alustiza holds Mexican citizenship since 2015.

Career
Alustiza started his career in Deportivo Santamarina and then moved to Chacarita Juniors, where he won promotion to the Argentine Primera División. He played the first half of 2010 on loan for Spanish team Xerez CD. After returning to a recently relegated Chacarita in June 2010, he was loaned out to Arsenal de Sarandí.

Deportivo Quito

2011 season
With good performances and goals, Matías Alustiza helped Deportivo Quito reach the 2011 Ecuadorian Serie A finals. He played both finals matches against Emelec, scoring in the second leg, winning the game 1-0 in the final minutes, and helped Quito become 2011 league champions.

2012 season
Alustiza had a great 2012 season with Deportivo Quito, most notably in the 2012 Copa Libertadores, becoming joint-top goal-scorer next to Santos FC's Neymar Da Silva, scoring 8 goals. His first goal in the Copa Libertadores campaign came against Chivas de Guadalajara in a 1-1 away draw. Next was a single penalty scored by Alustiza in a 3-0 home win against Velez Sarsfield. His most notable participation in the tournament came in a home win against Chivas, in an emphatic 5-0 win, with Matías scoring 4 goals. Alustiza was given the match-ball for his 4 goals by the referee. Alustiza scored his final goals against Universidad de Chile. Matías Alustiza was then sold to Mexican club Puebla FC.

Puebla FC
On June 28, 2012 Puebla FC announced via their official Facebook page that they had signed  Matías Alustiza and will be taking part in the Apertura 2012 and the  Copa Mexico Apertura 2012. In the Apertura 2012, Matias scored his first goal in the third round against Santos Laguna where he scored twice. In the Clausura 2013 Copa MX Matias was runner up score leader with 7 goals in 6 games. On May 15, 2013 Puebla FC bought 50% of the players contract from Ecuadorian club Quito and signed a 2-year extension that kept him at Puebla until 2015.

CF Pachuca
In June 2014, it was announced that CF Pachuca bought Alustiza from Puebla. On July 19 he made his debut with a goal for the win against Cruz Azul. On August 23, he scored a hat-trick against Atlas. In 2015, he returned to Puebla FC.
He back to Puebla in 2019

Style of play
A creative forward, Alustiza has good vision, passing, shot, ball control, dribbling skills and speed. Despite his small size, he can finish goals with the head. His presence on the pitch have good effect on his team's general performance. While his favored position is that of a second striker, he can also play as a lone striker and attacking midfielder.

Honors
Deportivo Quito
Serie A : 2011

Puebla
Copa MX: Clausura 2015
Supercopa MX: 2015

Individual
2012 Copa Libertadores: Tropheo Alberto Spencer for Top Goal-scorer - 8 Goals (tied with Neymar)

References

External links
 
 Argentine Primera statistics at Fútbol XXI  
 

1984 births
Living people
Sportspeople from Buenos Aires Province
Argentine footballers
Argentine expatriate footballers
Association football midfielders
Club y Biblioteca Ramón Santamarina footballers
Chacarita Juniors footballers
Albacete Balompié players
Xerez CD footballers
Arsenal de Sarandí footballers
S.D. Quito footballers
Club Puebla players
Atlas F.C. footballers
Club Universidad Nacional footballers
Atlético Tucumán footballers
La Liga players
Segunda División players
Argentine Primera División players
Primera Nacional players
Liga MX players
Expatriate footballers in Spain
Expatriate footballers in Ecuador
Expatriate footballers in Mexico
Argentine expatriate sportspeople in Spain
Argentine expatriate sportspeople in Ecuador
Argentine expatriate sportspeople in Mexico
Naturalized citizens of Mexico